The pearled treerunner (Margarornis squamiger) is a species of bird in the family Furnariidae.

It is found in Argentina, Bolivia, Colombia, Ecuador, Peru, and Venezuela. This songbird is an insectivore found in subtropical or tropical moist montane forests. Three subspecies of pearled treerunner are recognized:
 Margarornis squamiger perlatus (Lesson, 1844) – Northern Pearled Treerunner. Found in the Sierra de Perijá and the Andes of Western Venezuela, Colombia, Ecuador, and Northern Peru.
 Margarornis squamiger peruvianus (Cory, 1913). Founded in the Andes of Northern and Central Peru.
 Margarornis squamiger squamiger (d’Orbigny & Lafresnaye, 1838) – Southern Pearled Treerunner. Found in the Andes of Southern Peru and Bolivia, with a sight record in Northwestern Argentina.

References

pearled treerunner
Birds of the Northern Andes
pearled treerunner
Taxonomy articles created by Polbot
Taxa named by Alcide d'Orbigny
Taxa named by Frédéric de Lafresnaye